Kyriani Sabbe (born 26 January 2005) is a Belgian professional footballer who plays as a defender for Club NXT.

Club career
On 31 January 2021, Sabbe made his debut for Brugge's reserve side, Club NXT in the Belgian First Division B against Seraing.

Career statistics

Club

References

External links

2005 births
Living people
Belgian footballers
Association football defenders
Club Brugge KV players
Challenger Pro League players
Belgium youth international footballers